Tirunelveli district is one of the 38 districts of Tamil Nadu state in India. It is the largest district in terms of area with Tirunelveli as its headquarters. The district was formed on 1 September 1790 by the British East India Company (on behalf of the British government), and comprised the present Tirunelveli and Thoothukudi, Tenkasi and parts of Virudhunagar and Ramanathapuram district. As of 2011, the undivided district (along with Tenkasi) had a population of 3,077,233.

History 
Under the rule of the Pandyan Dynasty, the district was known as Thenpandiyanadu. The Chola dynasty then named it Mudikonda Cholamandalam. The Madurai Nayaks called it Tirunelveli Seemai. Under the British East India Company, it was Tinnevelly district, which included the modern Tirunelveli and Thoothukudi districts and parts of the Virudhunagar and Ramanathapuram districts.

In 1910, Ramanathapuram District was formed from portions of the Madurai and Tirunelveli Districts, which comprised portions of the modern Virudhunagar District.

After the Independence of India, Tirunelveli District was bifurcated on 20 October 1986 to Nellai-Kattabomman district (Tirunelveli) and Chidambaranar district (Tuticorin). Subsequently, the Government of Tamil Nadu decided to name each district according to the name of the headquarters town, so the region's name changed from Tirunelveli-Kattabomman to Tirunelveli.

On 18 July 2019 the district was again bifurcated to form a new Tenkasi district with Tenkasi as its district capital.

Geography

The district is located in the southern part of Tamil Nadu. It has borders with Tenkasi district to the north, Kanyakumari District to the south and Thoothukudi District to the east and Thiruvananthapuram district and Kollam district of Kerala to the west. It lies between 8°05' and 9°30' north latitude and 77°05' and 78°25' east longitude.

Climate
Tirunelveli has rainfall in all seasons ( in 2005 and 2006), and benefits from both the northeast and southwest monsoons. Most precipitation came from the northeast monsoon followed by the southwest monsoon and summer rains. The district is irrigated by several rivers originating in the Western Ghats, such as the Pachaiyar River, which flows into the perennial Thamirabarani River. The Thamirabarani and Manimuthar Rivers have many dams, with reservoirs providing water for irrigation and power generation. The Thamirabarani River provides consistent irrigation to a large agricultural area.

Administration and politics 
Tirunelveli is the Administration centre of Tirunelveli District. It is a part of the Tirunelveli Lok Sabha constituency.

|}

Revenue Divisions 
 Tirunelveli
 Cheranmahadevi

Taluks 

 Tirunelveli
 Palayamkottai
 Manur
 Cheranmahadevi
 Ambasamudram
 Nanguneri
 Radhapuram
 Thisayanvilai

New Proposals for taluks
 Pappakudi
 Kalakkad
 Valliyur

Assembly Consistuencies 

Since, Tenkasi District was bifurcated from Tirunelveli District, Tirunelveli District has only one Lok Sabha constituency and seven Assembly constituencies.

Tirunelveli Lok Sabha constituency:
Alangulam 
Tirunelveli
Palayamkottai
Ambasamudram
Nanguneri
Radhapuram

Demographics
According to 2011 census, Tirunelveli district (undivided) had a population of 3,077,233 with a sex-ratio of 1,023 females for every 1,000 males, much above the national average of 929. A total of 321,687 were under the age of six, constituting 164,157 males and 157,530 females. Scheduled Castes and Scheduled Tribes accounted for 18.51% and 0.33% of the population, respectively. The average literacy of the district was 73.88%, compared to the national average of 72.99%. The district had a total of 815,528 households. There were a total of 1,436,454 workers, comprising 107,943 cultivators, 321,083 main agricultural labourers, 215,667 in house hold industries, 626,714 other workers, 165,047 marginal workers, 7,772 marginal cultivators, 58,680 marginal agricultural labourers, 23,997 marginal workers in household industries and 74,598 other marginal workers. After the bifurcation, Tirunelveli district had a population of 1,692,296.

As per the religious census of 2011, the bifurcated Tirunelveli District had 74.87% Hindus, 15.06% Christians and 9.82% Muslims.

Infrastructure

The district is well-connected by a network of roads and railways. Tirunelveli city serves as the main junction. It has no airports; the nearest airports are at Tuticorin ( away), Madurai and Thiruvananthapuram. The district has a total of 27 railway stations. The tables below list the lengths of roads and railways in the district.

Canals, wells, tanks and reservoirs are the sources of irrigation in the district. The district also has 21,776 wells used for domestic purposes.

Electricity is provided by the Tamil Nadu Electricity Board (TNEB).

Koodankulam also has windmills used for power generation with installed capacity of 2,000 MW.

Education and social development

Tirunelveli district has a literacy rate of 76.97%, which is above the state average. As of 2005–2006, the district had a total of 2,494 schools. It has one University, the Manonmaniam Sundaranar University (MSU). There are also four Government colleges, eleven Government-sponsored colleges and seven private colleges.

Tirunelveli has 25 arts and science colleges, 3 medical colleges, 20 engineering colleges and a law school. There are 1,501 primary schools, 431 middle schools and 185 higher secondary schools.

Manonmaniam Sundaranar University, which was established in 1990, has a network of 102 affiliated colleges. In 1878, there were two colleges in the district: the Madurai Diraviam Thayumanavar Hindu College and St. John's College. The first college for women, Sarah Tucker college was established in 1895. Of the 17 arts colleges in the district, eight are co-educational institutions, five are for women and four for men. The colleges in Tirunelveli district were originally affiliated with the University of Madras. Upon the creation of Madurai Kamaraj University in 1966, they were affiliated with MKU from 1966 to 1990. In 1990, their affiliation transferred to Manonmaniam Sundaranar University. The Regional Directorate of the Collegiate Education in the district was formed on 10 September 1979 to regulate colleges in Tirunelveli, Thoothukudi and Kanyakumari districts. In 1996, the Government Law College, Tirunelveli was established. Tirunelveli Medical College and its teaching hospital are located at Palayamkottai. It was established in 1965 and affiliated with the University of Madras. The Government Siddha Medical College was established at Palayamkottai on 30 November 1964. Technical education in the district dates to 1844, when Mrs. Caldwell, wife of Bishop Robert Caldwell began a school to teach girls lace-making at Idyangudi. The Government of Tamil Nadu set up a State Board of Technical Education and Training and a separate Directorate of Technical Education, effective 1 October 1957. Since then, the Directorate of Technical Education has assumed the administration of both engineering colleges and polytechnics. The Government College of Engineering was established in October 1981 to fulfill the needs of people in the southern region.

In 1986, the Revenue district of Tirunelveli was divided into Tirunelveli and Thoothukkudi districts. There are three education districts.

Economy

Tirunelveli has been an agricultural area throughout its history. The district is a major producer of rice, coconuts, bananas, spices and forest-based products. The district is home to almost 50% of the buffalo population of Tamil Nadu. The district's livestock and poultry populations are as follows:

Since it is a coastal district, Tirunelveli is also involved in fishery development and production. For the period 2005–2006, the total inland fish catch was 1,874 tonnes, and the total marine fish catch was 7,014 tonnes.

India Cements Limited is the third largest cement company in India, and began at Sankarnagar in Tirunelveli in 1949.

The district is also rich in minerals, with a total of 407 mines and quarries. Limestone, granite and garnet sand are some of the minerals mined or produced in the district. Major industries include textile, food and forestry products.

A Special Economic Zone (SEZ) was introduced at Nanguneri in 2001. A pharma park and windmill spare-parts and television-manufacturing factories have been planned in this SEZ. The Tamil Nadu Industrial Development Corporation (TIDCO) has planned a ₹700-crore high-tech industrial park in Nanguneri in association with INFAC Group and Axes Technologies Inc of the US. The state government is planning light manufacturing, design and assembly facilities, modern infrastructure facilities and amenities in this SEZ to attract a workforce from around the world.

Recreation

Manjolai Hills
Located on top of the Manimuthar Dam and the Manimuthar Water Falls, the Manjolai area comprises tea plantations, small settlements, the Upper Kodaiyar Dam and a windy view point called Kuthiravetti.

The whole of the Manjolai Estates and the tea plantations are operated by The Bombay Burmah Trading Corporation Ltd on forest land leased by the Government of Tamil Nadu. There are three tea estates within the Manjolai area: Manjolai Estate, Manimutharu Estate and Oothu Estate.

Tiger Reserve
The  Kalakkad Mundanthurai Tiger Reserve was established in 1988. Kalakkad is the nearest town. Kalakkad has a temple called Malainambi temple with a falls.

Papanasam
Papanasam is a famous picnic spot in Tirunelveli district in the Indian state of Tamil Nadu. The site is popular for its tourists attractions such as the Thamirabarani River, Agasthiyar Falls, the Shiva Temple, Papanasam dam and the hydroelectric power plant.

Bird Sanctuary
A tiny village in the far south, Koonthankulam in Nanguneri Taluk of Tirunelveli District is emerging as a new favourite of the migratory birds. About 35 species of birds visit this calm but congenial village for breeding. The painted storks are coming from North India and East European Countries to this place. Similarly the flamingoes which flew in mainly from the Rann of Kutch have hatched and reared their young in the village.

Swamy Nellaiappar and Kanthimathi Ambal Temple
The Nellaiappar Temple is located at Tirunelveli. It is rooted in tradition and history, and is known for its musical pillars and other sculpted figures. The nearest airport is Tuticorin Airport (TCR) at Vagaikulam, a 30-minute drive (32 km) from Tirunelveli.

Melaseval Navaneethakrishnan Temple

The Navaneethakrishnan Temple at Melasevel Village,  from Tirunelveli Town on the road leading to Ambasamudram, is around 730 years old. Adhithyavarneshwar Temple, devoted to Lord Shiva is also famous in this village.  Twice a year, the sun's rays fall straight on the Lingam in the morning. Annual festivals are conducted at both these temples by people to whom the deity is kuladeivam (family deity). Dolotsavam utsavam on every month, on the day of Star ROHINI at the Navaneethakrishnan temple is quite familiar, and many childless couples take part in this pooja. Garuda Sevai is conducted on all four Saturdays of the Tamil month of Purattasi and attracts a large number of devotees from the neighbouring villages. With the kind permission of the HRE department of the State Government, the Melaseval Bhaktha Jana Seva Trust maintains the temple with daily rituals and regular poojas. The Uriyadi festival during Krishnashtami is an important event in this small village.

Notable people

Gallery

See also
List of districts of Tamil Nadu

References

External links 

 Tirunelveli District

 
Districts of Tamil Nadu
1790 establishments in British India